The Canton of Saint-Gengoux-le-National is a French former canton, located in the arrondissement of Mâcon, in the Saône-et-Loire département (Burgundy région). It had 4,118 inhabitants (2012). It was disbanded following the French canton reorganisation which came into effect in March 2015. It consisted of 19 communes, which joined the canton of Cluny in 2015.

The canton comprised the following communes:

Saint-Gengoux-le-National (seat)
 Ameugny
 Bissy-sous-Uxelles
 Bonnay
 Burnand
 Burzy
 Chapaize
 Chissey-lès-Mâcon
 Cormatin
 Cortevaix
 Curtil-sous-Burnand
 Malay
 Passy
 Sailly
 Saint-Huruge
 Saint-Ythaire
 Savigny-sur-Grosne
 Sigy-le-Châtel
 Taizé

See also
Cantons of the Saône-et-Loire department
Arrondissements of the Saône-et-Loire department

References

Former cantons of Saône-et-Loire
2015 disestablishments in France
States and territories disestablished in 2015